

Current listings

|}

References

Ben Hill
Ben Hill County, Georgia